"Down in the River to Pray" (also known as "Down to the River to Pray," "Down in the Valley to Pray," "The Good Old Way," and "Come, Let Us All Go Down") is a traditional American song variously described as a Christian folk hymn, an African-American spiritual, an Appalachian song, and a Southern gospel song. The exact origin of the song is unknown.

Lyrics and versions

The earliest known version of the song, titled "The Good Old Way," was published in Slave Songs of the United States in 1867. The song (#104) was contributed to that book by George H. Allan of Nashville, Tennessee, who may also have been the transcriber. The lyrics printed in this collection are:

Another version, titled "Come, Let Us All Go Down," was published in 1880 in The Story of the Jubilee Singers; With Their Songs, a book about the Fisk Jubilee Singers. 

This version also refers to a valley rather than a river; the first verse is:

In some versions, "in the river" is replaced by "to the river". The phrase "in the river" is significant, for two reasons. The more obvious reason is that the song has often been sung at outdoor baptisms (such as the full-immersion baptism depicted in the 2000 film O Brother, Where Art Thou?). Another reason is that many songs sung by victims of slavery contained coded messages for escaping. When the enslaved people escaped, they would walk in the river because the water would cover their scent from the bounty-hunters' dogs. Similarly, the "starry crown" could refer to navigating their escape by the stars. And "Good Lord, show me the way" could be a prayer for God's guidance to find the escape route, commonly known as "the Underground Railroad."

Mistaken attributions
Some sources mistakenly claim that the song was published in The Southern Harmony and Musical Companion in 1835, several decades before the effort to gather and publish Black spirituals gained momentum in the Reconstruction Era. There is in fact a song called "The Good Old Way" in The Southern Harmony (also found in the Sacred Harp); that song, however, has completely different melody and lyrics (which likewise should not be confused with a Manx hymn tune of the same name and text, made famous by the Watersons) Its lyrics begin as follows:

Notable recordings
1927: Price Family Sacred Singers (Okeh 40796)
1929: Delta Big Four from Screamin' and Hollerin' the Blues: The Worlds of Charley Patton (Gennett Records)
1940: Lead Belly from Let It Shine On Me -- The Library Of Congress Recordings, V. 3 (New Rounder)
1966: Doc Watson from Home Again! (Vanguard Records)
1970: Arlo Guthrie, single, Reprise Records 0951 
2000: Alison Krauss from O Brother, Where Art Thou? (Lost Highway/Mercury)
2002: Little Axe from Hard Grind (On-U Sound)
2003: Doc Watson, Ricky Skaggs and Alison Krauss from The Three Pickers (Rounder / Umgd)
2004: The Spooky Men's Chorale on their CD Tooled up 
2005: The King's Singers from Six (Signum UK)
2005: Jill Johnson from The Christmas in You (Lionheart Records)
2009: Mormon Tabernacle Choir from Come Thou Fount of Every Blessing: American Folk Hymns & Spirituals (Mormon Tabernacle Choir)
2012: Sonya Isaacs from Hymns from the Old Country Church (Spring Hill Music Group)
2014: Nia Frazier performed a solo to a version of the song on Lifetime's Dance Moms
2014: Noah Gundersen partially covered the song on his 2014 album "Ledges". It was titled "Poor Man's Son."
2015: DeAnna Johnson performed on The Voice.
2015: Pacific Boychoir Adademy and Kevin Fox performed on The Kenyon Family episode of The_Blacklist_(TV_series).
2016: Michael W. Smith from Hymns II - Shine On Us.
2020: Greg Jong for the Wasteland 3 soundtrack (INgrooves / inXile Entertainment)
2022: The Petersens from My Ozark Mountain Home (The Petersens)

See also 
 Songs of the Underground Railroad

References

External links 
 Choral arrangements at ChoralWiki
 "Come, Let Us All Go Down" at Bluegrass Messengers website

Songs about rivers
African-American spiritual songs
Alison Krauss songs
Bluegrass songs
American Christian hymns
Gospel songs
Jill Johnson songs
Appalachian folk songs